The 2007 World Indoor Football League season would turn out to be the only season of the World Indoor Football League (WIFL). The league champions were the Augusta Spartans, who defeated the Columbus Lions in World Indoor Bowl I.

Standings

 Grey indicates clinched best regular-season record
 Green indicates clinched playoff berth

Playoffs

Opening round

World Indoor Bowl I

External links
 WIFL's 2007 Stats
 WIFL's Inaugural All-League Team List

World Indoor Football League (2007)
Indoor American football seasons